Bergshamra may refer to:

 Bergshamra, Norrtälje - a locality in Norrtälje Municipality, Stockholm County, Sweden
 Bergshamra, Solna - a suburb in Solna Municipality, Stockholm County, Sweden.